Daniel Melingo (born October 22, 1957) is an Argentine musician, with a background in rock (he played guitar for Los Twist and saxophone for Los Abuelos de la Nada). He is now a tango artist and tours with his band Los Ramones del tango.

Biography

Melingo was exposed to music since his childhood days, as his stepfather was Edmundo Rivero's manager. After playing for some time with Brazilian singer Milton Nascimento, Melingo was active in the Buenos Aires independent theater scene in the early 1980s, under the military dictatorship. When the restrictions on cultural activities eased after the Falklands war, Melingo became a notable participant in projects such as a rock opera version of "Dr. Moreau's Trials", masterminded by Victor Kesselman, and Los Twist, a fun band with echoes of The B-52's. He was called by Cachorro López to play the sax in the Abuelos de la Nada reunion, where he was, according to colleague Andrés Calamaro, the person who established the band's musical direction.

After the Abuelos and Twist, Melingo spent time in Spain, where he formed a band named Lions in Love. Back in Argentina, he issued a disc based on the mythical Argentine graphic novel El Eternauta, and later on turned to tango singer. He has issued several recordings to critical acclaim, toured the world, and was hailed by the British press as "the man who's making tango seriously cool" .

Discography

 H2O, 1995
 Tangos Bajos, 1998
 Ufa!, 1999
 Santa Milonga, 2004
 Maldito Tango, 2007
 Corazón & Hueso, 2011
 Linyera, 2014
 Anda, 2016
With David Murray
Plays Nat King Cole en Español (Motema, 2011)

Awards

 Premios Gardel 2009 : Best male artist tango album with "Maldito Tango"
 Latin Grammy 2009 : Nominated for best tango album with "Maldito Tango"

Guest appearances

 Vocals and clarinet on "Tu Misterio" (track #7 on the album Tango 3.0 of Gotan Project)

References

External links
 Melingo's website
 Mañana, Melingo's record label
 The Brutal Voice of Tango: An Interview With Daniel Melingo (Sounds and Colours)
 Rolling Stone article (Spanish)
 Rock.com.ar profile (Spanish)
 The Guardian (English)

1957 births
Tango musicians
Living people
20th-century Argentine male singers
Argentine people of Greek descent
Tango singers
21st-century Argentine male singers